Joseph Peter (born 23 September 1949) is a Swiss long-distance runner. He competed in the marathon at the 1980 Summer Olympics.

References

1949 births
Living people
Athletes (track and field) at the 1980 Summer Olympics
Swiss male long-distance runners
Swiss male marathon runners
Olympic athletes of Switzerland
Place of birth missing (living people)